Jan Gerard Wichers (15 July 1745 – 3 October 1808) was a military officer and lawyer. He served as Governor of Suriname from 1784 until 1790.

Biography
Wichers was born on 15 July 1745 in Groningen, Dutch Republic. In 1760, he started studying law at the University of Groningen, and obtained his doctorate on 15 June 1768. He enlisted in the army.

In 1771, Wichers was appointed Raad Fiscaal (Attorney general) in Suriname. In 1775, Jan Wicherides, his only child, was born as a result of an extra-maritial affair with the free negress Adjuba. Jan Wicherides would later become mayor of Uithoorn.

On 24 December 1784, Wichers was appointed Governor-General of Suriname. In 1785, he was promoted major general. In 1790, Fort Groningen was built. A city was planned around the fort, however the development of the town remained limited. Wichers wanted to promote a mixed race middle class, because he felt that the Europeans in the colony had little loyalty to Suriname. He had planned, but never executed, to give an award of ƒ100,- for every mixed race child who was manumitted.

On 15 June 1790, Wichers was succeeded by Jurriaan François de Friderici. He returned to the Netherlands, and became a member of the Council of American Colonies in the Hague. In 1806, he became a member of the Maatschappij der Nederlandse Letterkunde.

Wichers died on 3 October 1808 in Vreeswijk, at the age of 63.

Legacy 
In 2012, RTV Noord aired a documentary about Groningen, Suriname, the town founded by Jan Wichers.

References 

1745 births
1808 deaths
Governors of Suriname
Dutch generals
University of Groningen alumni
18th-century Surinamese lawyers
People from Groningen (city)
18th-century Danish lawyers